Bab Bini (also Romanized as Bāb Bīnī and Bāb-e Bīnī; also known as Bābīnī, Dārbīnī, and Dermīnī Bābīnī) is a village in Rayen Rural District, Rayen District, Kerman County, Kerman Province, Iran. At the 2006 census, its population was 201, in 56 families.

References 

Populated places in Kerman County